Soma Dutta (born 25 December 1967) is an Indian sport shooter. She competed in rifle shooting events at the 1984 Summer Olympics, the 1988 Summer Olympics and the 1992 Summer Olympics.

Olympic results

References

1967 births
Living people
ISSF rifle shooters
Indian female sport shooters
Shooters at the 1984 Summer Olympics
Shooters at the 1988 Summer Olympics
Shooters at the 1992 Summer Olympics
Olympic shooters of India
Shooters at the 1986 Asian Games
Shooters at the 1990 Asian Games
Asian Games medalists in shooting
Asian Games silver medalists for India
Asian Games bronze medalists for India
Medalists at the 1986 Asian Games
Medalists at the 1990 Asian Games
Commonwealth Games medallists in shooting
Commonwealth Games bronze medallists for India
Recipients of the Arjuna Award
Shooters at the 1990 Commonwealth Games
20th-century Indian women
Medallists at the 1990 Commonwealth Games